This is a list of all the major variations of the Machin series of postage stamps in the United Kingdom. The complete list of all variations is vast and outside the scope of this encyclopedia.

Note: the colours and the colour descriptions are to be used to give an idea only, as each catalogue and website will name the colours differently.

Pre-decimal issues
The first Machins were issued in 1967 and were in use until the UK changed to a decimal currency in 1971. These Machins came in two sizes, with the four higher value stamps being the largest.

Decimal issues
The decimal Machins have been issued throughout Britain's period of decimalisation, and continue to be produced today. During the 1970s and 1980s, Royal Mail issued 12 Machins in a larger format. Other major variations include:
Elliptical perforation: In 1993 Royal Mail started issuing Machins with two large elliptical perforations, one on either side, as a security feature. Some Machins have both standard and elliptical perfs, but those issued after 1993 only have the ellipticals.
EME Images: In 1997 a new profile of the Queen was used on Machins. EME (or electro-mechanically engraved) images are created by computer and therefore offer better detail in the image.
Regional issues: These Machins were issued with a heraldic symbol in the top left-hand corner. These represent the Isle of Man with the Three Legs of Man symbol; Northern Ireland with the Red Hand of Ulster symbol; Scotland with the Lion of Scotland symbol and Wales with the Welsh Dragon symbol.

Small size

Large size

NVI (non-value indicator) issues

NVI (or non-value indicator) Machins first appeared in 1989 in an attempt to negate the need to keep issuing new stamps after each postal rate change. They are marked 1st and 2nd for the two classes of post in the United Kingdom. The E NVI stamp represented the standard letter rate to Europe.

Small size

Horizontal issues

Large size

Penny Black anniversary issues
In 1990, the Royal Mail issued five stamps to commemorate the 150th anniversary of the Penny Black. They featured the Machin image  of Queen Elizabeth II overlaying the image of Queen Victoria from the Penny Black. An NVI issue was released in 2000.

Small size

Airmail issues

Small size

Self-adhesive stamps
Since about 2009, virtually all Machins have been issued only as self-adhesive stamps.  The primary exceptions have been stamps issued as part of Prestige Stamp Booklets or in souvenir sheets.

Barcoded series (2021–present) 

Machin stamps with Data Matrix barcodes were introduced in two stages, on 1 February 2022 (non-value indicators), and 4 April 2022 (other values). All barcoded stamps are self-adhesive.

Existing definitive stamps issued from 15 February 1971 to 31 January 2022 remain valid until 31 January 2023: since 31 March 2022, they can be indefinitely exchanged for the barcoded series.

The 2022 issue was the last release in the Machin series prior to the death of Elizabeth II. On 8 February 2023, the design for the new definitive series, to be released on 4 April 2023 and featuring a portrait of Charles III by Martin Jennings, was revealed.

2021 barcoded trial

2022 barcoded issues

Notes

Footnotes

Postage stamps of the United Kingdom